This is the results breakdown of the local elections held in the Balearic Islands on 26 May 1991. The following tables show detailed results in the autonomous community's most populous municipalities, sorted alphabetically.

Overall

City control
The following table lists party control in the most populous municipalities, including provincial capitals (shown in bold). Gains for a party are displayed with the cell's background shaded in that party's colour.

Municipalities

Calvià

Ciutadella de Menorca
Population: 21,092

Ibiza
Population: 33,776

Inca
Population: 22,219

Llucmajor
Population: 17,977

Manacor
Population: 28,791

Maó-Mahón
Population: 24,383

Palma de Mallorca
Population: 325,120

Santa Eulària des Riu
Population: 17,615

See also
1991 Balearic regional election

References

Balearic Islands
1991